Olav Hindahl (17 October 1892, Stavanger – 14 June 1963, Oslo) was a Norwegian trade unionist and politician for the Labour Party.

He started his career as a typographer, and became involved in the local labour union. He rose up the ladder and became leader of the Norwegian Central Union of Book Printers, and then of the Norwegian Confederation of Trade Unions in 1934. He left in 1939 to become Minister of Labour in the cabinet Nygaardsvold. During the German occupation of Norway he also headed, in exile, the Ministry of Trade. He relinquished both posts in 1945, but from 1946 to 1963 he directed the Norwegian Labour Inspection Authority.

On the local level he was a member of Stavanger city council from 1923 to 1925 and Aker municipal council from 1929 to 1931.

References

1892 births
1963 deaths
Norwegian trade unionists
Labour Party (Norway) politicians
Politicians from Stavanger
Politicians from Aker
Government ministers of Norway
Directors of government agencies of Norway